Shona Shukrula (born 24 May 1991) is a Dutch football referee.

Career

In 2017, Shukrula became a listed referee for FIFA.

Personal life

In 2021, she started dating professional footballer Jeff Hardeveld.

References

1991 births
Dutch football referees
Dutch people of Surinamese descent
Living people
Women association football referees